Kadan Kyun is the largest island in the Mergui Archipelago, Myanmar. The highest point is French Bay Peak, which is the highest point in the archipelago.

Etymology
Under the British, the island was known as King Island, King's Island, and later as Kadan Island or Kadan Kyun, based on the local pronunciation.

Communities
Among the communities on Kadan Island are Gyindaungchaung, Kabingyaung, Kapa, Kyataw, Mayanchaung, Tharawuntaungnge and Yemyitkyi.

See also
List of islands of Burma

Notes

Mergui Archipelago